Magda Iskander is a social entrepreneur in Egypt.

Raised in a village in Egypt, she wanted to study music as a child. She found herself on the path of medicine instead, and was intrigued by radiology, which she studied in the United States. In 1984, she discovered that ultrasound was not available in Egypt, and began establishing training centers in Cairo.

She is the founder of Care with Love, an organization that trains recruits to provide quality health care and assistance for the elderly and other homebound.

She was elected an Ashoka: Innovators for the Public Fellow in 2003.

Notes

External links
 Podcast Interview with Magda Iskander Social Innovation Conversations, June 6, 2008

Living people
Ashoka Egypt Fellows
Year of birth missing (living people)